Peter Louis Stanicek (born April 18, 1963 in Harvey, Illinois) is a former Major League Baseball player. Primarily a second baseman and left fielder, Stanicek was a member of the Baltimore Orioles in 1987 and 1988. He was 5'11" (1.8 m) and weighed 185 pounds (84 kg).  He was a switch-hitter and threw right-handed.

Amateur career

Stanicek is an alumnus of Rich East High School in Park Forest, Illinois and Stanford University. In 1984, he played collegiate summer baseball with the Orleans Cardinals of the Cape Cod Baseball League. He was drafted by the Baltimore Orioles in the 13th round of the 1984 MLB Draft, but did not sign with the team.  He was again selected by the Orioles in the ninth round of the 1985 MLB Draft, and signed this time.

Professional career
He spent the 1986 season with the class A Hagerstown Suns, being selected as second baseman for Carolina League's end-of-season All Star Team.

He was called up to the Baltimore Orioles and batted leadoff on September 1, 1987 in a home game against the Seattle Mariners. Stanicek had one of Baltimore's two hits that night off Seattle's Scott Bankhead in a 5-0 defeat. His sixth-inning leadoff single was his first MLB hit, but he was stranded by the next three batters, brothers Billy and Cal Ripken Jr. and Eddie Murray.

Stanicek played in 30 games that fall with a batting average of .274.  He began the 1988 season with Rochester, an AAA team, but was called up on April 29, 1988, after the Orioles began the season with a record-breaking 21-game losing streak. Manager Cal Ripken, Sr. was fired in the midst of it and replaced by Frank Robinson. The losing streak came to end April 29 at Comiskey Park in Chicago, with Stanicek batting leadoff and collecting two hits in a 9-0 Baltimore victory.

He came up to the Orioles as a multi-purpose man, able to play second base, third base and outfield.  In 1988, he led his team in stolen bases with 12 and had a batting average of .230.

But he was plagued by injuries, and the 1990 season, which Stanicek spent between Hagerstown and Rochester in the minors, turned out to be his last in professional baseball.

Personal
He is the brother of major leaguer Steve Stanicek. They made their big-league debuts 15 days apart in 1987.

References

External links
Stanicek's major league statistics at Baseball-Reference.com
A partial listing of Stanicek's minor league statistics at The Baseball Cube

1963 births
Hagerstown Suns players
Baltimore Orioles players
Living people
Major League Baseball left fielders
Major League Baseball second basemen
Baseball players from Illinois
Orleans Firebirds players
Charlotte O's players
Newark Orioles players
Rochester Red Wings players